was an ace fighter pilot in the Imperial Japanese Navy (IJN) during World War II. Participating in many of the Pacific War battles and campaigns as a member of several units, Okabe was officially credited with destroying 15 enemy aircraft. Okabe was credited with shooting down eight enemy aircraft on 8 May 1942 during the Battle of the Coral Sea, the IJN's official record for the number of aircraft destroyed in a single encounter. He is famous for his strong opposition to the kamikaze attacks, rare in IJN at the time. Okabe survived the war.

References

Notes

Sources

1915 births
Year of death unknown
Japanese naval aviators
Japanese World War II flying aces
Military personnel from Fukuoka Prefecture
Imperial Japanese Navy officers